A Study in Reds (1932) is a polished amateur film by Miriam Bennett which spoofs women’s clubs and the Soviet menace in the 1930s. While listening to a tedious lecture on the Soviet threat, Wisconsin Dells’ Tuesday Club members fall asleep and find themselves laboring in an all-women collective in Russia under the unflinching eye of the Soviet special police.

In 2009, it was named to the National Film Registry by the Library of Congress for being “culturally, historically or aesthetically” significant and will be preserved for all time.

References

External links
A Study in Reds essay  by Patricia R. Zimmermann at National Film Registry 
A Study in Reds essay by Daniel Eagan In America's Film Legacy, 2009-2010: A Viewer's Guide To The 50 Landmark Movies Added To The National Film Registry In 2009-10, Bloomsbury Publishing USA, 2011,  pages 40–43 

The film can be viewed at the Library of Congress National Screening Room 

1932 films
United States National Film Registry films
American independent films
1930s American films